MBAR, Mbar or mbar may refer to:

Arts and entertainment 
 Mbar Ndiaye, French taekwondo athlete.
 Musée des Beaux-Arts de Rennes

STEM and medicine 
 mbar or millibar
 Mbar or megabar
 Multistate Bennett acceptance ratio

Other uses 
 Mbar (rural district), a rural district in the Gossas Department, Senegal
 mbar1260, Glottolog code of the Mbara language (Chad)
 mbar1261, Glottolog code of the Mbara language (Australia)